Sayacmarca is an archaeological site in Peru located in the Cusco Region, Urubamba Province, Machupicchu District. It is situated southwest of the archaeological site Runkuraqay and the Runkuraqay pass and southeast of the sites Phuyupatamarka and Qunchamarka.

Hiram Bingham III visited the site in April 1915, referring to it as Cedrobamba, or cedar plain.

See also 
 Inti Punku
 Pakaymayu
 Warmi Wañusqa
 Wiñay Wayna

References 

Archaeological sites in Peru
Archaeological sites in Cusco Region